1910 in Argentine football saw  Alumni regain the championship, winning its 9th title in 11 seasons.

Primera División

The 1909 championship was reduced from 10 to 9 teams, with each team playing the other twice.

Gimnasia y Esgrima de Buenos Aires (promoted last year) made its debut at the top division while Argentino de Quilmes was relegated to  Segunda División.

Final standings

Lower divisions

Primera B
Champion: Estudiantes (BA)

Primera C
Champion: Instituto Americano (Adrogué)

Domestic cups

Copa de Competencia Jockey Club
Champion: Estudiantes (BA)

Final

International cups

Tie Cup
Champion: none

Final

Argentina national team
Argentina won the first tournament of the year, the South America Cup. The squad would then lose the Copa Lipton and Copa Premier Honor Argentino finals at the hands of Uruguay.

South America Cup

Copa Lipton

Copa Premier Honor Argentino

Friendly matches

References

 
Seasons in Argentine football